Arjune Nandu (born 31 December 1971) is a Guyanese cricketer. He played in four first-class matches for Guyana from 1988 to 1992.

See also
 List of Guyanese representative cricketers

References

External links
 

1971 births
Living people
Guyanese cricketers
Guyana cricketers